The 25th BRDC International Trophy was a non-championship Formula One race held at Silverstone on 8 April 1973. The race was run in connection with a Formula 5000 event.

Classification 
Note: a blue background indicates a Formula 5000 entrant.

Notes
Fastest lap: Ronnie Peterson - 1:17.5
Pole Position: Emerson Fittipaldi - 1:16.4

References

BRDC International Trophy
BRDC International Trophy
Formula 5000 race reports
BRDC
BRDC International Trophy